is a Japanese novel by Ryu Murakami published in 1997 and published in English in 2009. It was the basis for the 1999 film Audition, directed by Takashi Miike.

Characters 
 Aoyama: Aoyama is a forty-two year old widower who sets two goals for himself on the recommendation of a physician. The first goal was to spend as much time as possible with his son Shige, which he considers to be accomplished. The latter goal was to bring an acclaimed East German pipe organist to Japan to hold a free concert, which in reality is a ploy so that he may record the rare concert and sell it on VHS. Aoyama is extremely nostalgic for the Japan of his youth, often complaining about modern music and culture, seeing it as materialistic and boring. 
 Yamasaki Asami: A beautiful 24-year-old woman and aspiring actress that Aoyama meets during the audition, when he first sees her Aoyama falls instantly in love. During one of their dates Asami reveals that she was a victim of childhood abuse from her step father who used a wheelchair and who believed that Asami wasn't human after giggling at her own father's funeral. At first it seems that Asami had been able to cope with this trauma positively through ballet, but it is revealed that the abuse had left her extremely unstable and violent, often entering into relationships with men only to murder them by severing their feet for "lying".   
 Yoshikawa: Aoyama's long time friend and business associate who first introduces Aoyama to the idea of him finding a wife under the guise of an audition for a nonexistent film. Yoshikawa is the first character in the novel to distrust Asami after uncovering the fact that her mentor had been dead for nearly a year and a half. 
 Shige: Aoyama's fifteen year old son and only child of his marriage with Ryoko. Shige is described as being a bright and athletic young man who is considerably popular at his high school. He often acts as a foil to his father.  Shige inadvertently causes the events of the novel by asking his father: "Why don't you find yourself a new wife, Pops?"
 Ryoko: Aoyama's wife who dies of viral cancer seven years prior to the novel.

Reception
Kim Newman, writing for The Independent, compared the English-adaptation of the book to the film of the same name by Takashi Miike, finding that the movie was "suggestive about elements the book spells out bluntly. Miike gained a lot from elegantly wrought source material – but the book is now in danger of seeming like a draft, or even a screen treatment." Kasia Boddy praised the novel in The Telegraph, stating that Murakami "allows author and reader to have it both ways, simultaneously indulging a taste for schlock and some low-level guilt about "objectification".

Nathan Rabin of Artforum opined that "Audition depends less on the bracing nastiness of its final twist than on the skillful interplay of the horrific and the mundane" and that "Murakami is not a subtle writer. He lays out the freshman-level psychology behind Asami's actions with all the ham-fisted literalness of the psychiatrist explaining how poor Norman Bates went a little batty after murdering his mother and her lover in Psycho. But if Audition skirts sexism, it's still enormously savvy about the roles class, age, social status, and gender play in romantic relationships, as well as about the queasy voyeurism and exploitation endemic to the entertainment industry."

References

External links 
  Review by Irvine Welsh

1997 Japanese novels
Japanese-language novels
Japanese horror novels
Japanese novels adapted into films
Novels by Ryū Murakami